Chinese dominoes are used in several tile-based games, namely, tien gow, pai gow, tiu u and kap tai shap.  In Cantonese they are called , which literally means "bone tiles"; it is also the name of a northern Chinese game, where the rules are quite different from the southern Chinese version of tien gow.

History
Ming author Xie Zhaozhe (1567–1624) records the legend of dominoes having been presented to Song Emperor Huizong in 1112. However the contemporary Li Qingzhao (1084 – ) made no mention of dominoes in her compendium of games. The oldest confirmed written mention of dominoes in China comes from the Former Events in Wulin (i.e. the capital Hangzhou) written by the Yuan Dynasty (1271–1368) author Zhou Mi (1232–1298), who listed "pupai" (gambling plaques or dominoes) as well as dice as items sold by peddlers during the reign of Song Emperor Xiaozong. Andrew Lo asserts that Zhou Mi meant dominoes when referring to pupai, since the Ming author Lu Rong (1436–1494) explicitly defined pupai as dominoes (in regards to a story of a suitor who won a maiden's hand by drawing out four winning pupai from a set). Tiles dating from the 12th to 14th centuries have survived. Unlike most modern tiles they are white with black and red pips.

During the Qing dynasty (1644-1912), the suits known as "Chinese" and "barbarian" were renamed to "civil" and "military" respectively to avoid offending the ruling Manchus. Tiles with blank ends, like those found in Western "double-six" dominoes, once existed during the 17th century. These games employed two sets of "double-six" tiles. It is possible that these were the types of dominoes that made it to Europe the following century.

Deck composition and ranking
Each tile pattern in the Chinese domino set is made up of the outcome of a throw of two six-sided dice. Each combination is only used once, so there are 21 unique possible patterns. Eleven of these 21 unique patterns are repeated to make a total of 32 tiles in a Chinese dominoes set. The tile set consists of 32 tiles in two "suits" or groups called "military" and "civil". There are no markings on the tiles to distinguish these suits; a player must simply remember which tiles belong to which group.

The tile set contains two each of eleven civil suit tiles (6-6, 1-1, 4-4, 1-3, 5-5, 3-3, 2-2, 5-6, 4-6, 1-6, 1-5) and one each of ten military suit tiles (3-6, 4-5; 2-6, 3-5; 2-5, 3-4; 2-4; 1-4, 2-3; 1-2).  Each civil tile also has a Chinese name (and common rough translation to English): The 6-6 is tin ( heaven), 1-1 is dei ( earth), 4-4 is yan ( man), 1-3 is ngo ( goose or  harmony), 5-5 is mui ( plum flower), 3-3 is cheung ( long), 2-2 is ban ( board), 5-6 is fu ( hatchet), 4-6 is ping ( partition), 1-6 is tsat (long leg seven), and 1-5 is luk (big head six).

The civil tiles are ranked according to the Chinese cultural significance of the tile names, and must be memorized.  The hendiatris of  dates back for over two thousand years  while the harmony of the three have been in dice and domino games since at least the Ming dynasty. Remembering the suits and rankings of the tiles is easier if one understands the Chinese names of the tiles and the symbolism behind them. The military tiles are named and ranked according to the total points on the tiles.  For example, the "nines" (3-6 and 4-5) rank higher than the "eights" (2-6 and 3-5).

The military tiles (since there is only one each) are also considered to be five mixed "pairs" (for example, the 3-6 and 4-5 tiles "match" because they have same total points and both in the military suit).  Among the military tiles, individual tiles of the same pair (such as 1-4 and 2-3) rank equally.   The 2-4 and 1-2 are an odd pair.  They are the only tiles in the whole set that don't match other tiles in the normal sense.  This pair when played together is considered a suit on its own, called the gi jun ( supreme).  It is the highest ranking pair in the game of Pai Gow, though the tiles rank low individually (in their normal order).  When a tile of this pair is played individually in the game of Tien Gow, each takes its regular ranking among other military suit tiles according to the total points.  The rankings of the individual tiles are similar in most games.  However, the ranking of combination tiles is slightly different in Pai Gow and Tien Gow.

Using the same coloring scheme of the traditional Chinese dice, every half-domino with 1 or 4 pips has those pips colored red (for example, the 4-5 domino has four red pips and five white pips). The only exception is the pair of 6-6 tiles.  Half of the pips on the 6-6 domino are colored red to make them stand out as the top ranking tiles.

There are also sets with where the tiles have Xiangqi characters next to the pips. As Xiangqi also has 32 pieces, these dual use sets can be used to play Giog. Variant sets include the  game in which some tiles have flowers or frames printed on them while others have their values duplicated and may have mahjong type flower and blank tiles.

Bone tiles game

The eponymous game of Bone Tiles (gǔpái in Mandarin) is played in northern and central China and as far south as Hunan. The name suggests that it is or became the default game played with dominoes in those regions. It is a trick-taking game similar to Tien Gow but has been simplified. In single-tile tricks, the civil and military suits have been merged into a single suit. In double-tile tricks, there is a new ranking order similar to Pai Gow. Triple-tile and quadruple-tile tricks are not allowed as in older versions of Tien Gow. Scoring has been simplified to number of stacks won.

References

External links
 Domino games rules (including Chinese Dominoes)

 
Chinese inventions
Chinese

it:Domino cinesi